is a 2010 Japanese drama film directed by Masahiro Kobayashi. It was released in Japan on 22 May. The film stars Tatsuya Nakadai as Tadao, the lead actor; Eri Tokunaga as Haru, the lead actress; Hideji Ōtaki as Shigeo Kanamoto (Tadao's brother); Teruyuki Kagawa as Shinichi Tsuda (Haru's father); Naho Toda as Nobuko Tsuda (Shinichi's wife). The film was distributed by Asmik Ace and T-Joy.

Reception
The film won the 65th Mainichi Film Award for Excellence Film, and the actress Eri Tokunaga won the Sponichi Grand Prix Newcomer Award for her role in the film. Mark Schilling of The Japan Times gave the film 4 out of 5 stars.

References

External links
 

2010s Japanese films